The Hand of Night is a 1968 British horror film directed by Frederic Goode and starring William Sylvester, Diane Clare and Aliza Gur. It is also known by the alternative title Beast of Morocco. Its plot concerns a man who encounters a dangerous woman while searching for his friend, a missing archaeologist, in Morocco.

Cast
 William Sylvester - Paul Carver 
 Diane Clare - Chantal 
 Aliza Gur - Marisa 
 Edward Underdown - Gunther 
 Terence De Marney - Omar 
 William Dexter - Leclerc 
 Sylvia Marriott - Mrs Petty 
 Avril Sadler - Mrs Carver 
 Angela Lovell - Air Hostess 
 Maria Hallowi - Nurse

References

External links

1968 films
British horror films
1968 horror films
Films set in Morocco
1960s English-language films
1960s British films